USP26 is a peptidase enzyme. The USP26 gene is an X-linked gene exclusively expressed in the testis and it codes for the ubiquitin-specific protease 26. The USP26 gene is found at Xq26.2 on the X-chromosome as a single exon. The enzyme that this gene encodes comprises 913 amino acid residues and it is 104 kilodalton in size, which is transcribed from a sequence of 2794 nucleotide base-pairs on the X-chromosome. The USP26 enzyme is a deubiquitinating enzyme that places a very significant role in the regulation of protein turnover during spermatogenesis. It is a testis-specific enzyme that is solely express in spermatogonia and can prevent the degradation of ubiquitinated USP26 substrates.

Recent research has suggested that defects in USP26 may be involved in some cases of male infertility, specifically Sertoli cell-only syndrome, and an absence of sperm in the ejaculate (azoospermia).

See also 
Male infertility

References

External links